Jennifer Shah (née Lui; born October 4, 1973) is an American television personality. She is a cast member of the reality television series The Real Housewives of Salt Lake City. Shah pleaded guilty to a conspiracy criminal charge in 2022, for which she is serving prison time.

Life and career
Shah is of Tongan and Hawaiian descent. Originally a Mormon, she converted to Islam. Shah is married to football coach Sharrieff Shah. The two met while attending the University of Utah as students. They have two sons together.

Shah starred on the reality television series The Real Housewives of Salt Lake City, which premiered in November 2020. In March 2021, she was criminally charged with conspiracy to commit money laundering and wire fraud, pleading not guilty to both charges days later. Her legal case was chronicled in the documentary film Housewife and the Shah Shocker, which premiered on Hulu in November that same year. In July 2022, Shah pleaded guilty to conspiracy to commit wire fraud. In January 2023, Shah was sentenced to six-and-a-half years in prison. Shah began her prison sentence the following month.

Filmography
The Real Housewives of Salt Lake City, 2020–2023

References

External links

1973 births
Living people
21st-century American criminals
21st-century American women
American Muslims
American people convicted of mail and wire fraud
American people of Tongan descent
American people of Native Hawaiian descent
Criminals from Utah
Former Latter Day Saints
People from Salt Lake City
The Real Housewives cast members
University of Utah alumni